Chamaesphecia aerifrons is a moth of the family Sesiidae. It is found in Morocco, Algeria, Tunisia, Spain, Portugal, France, southern Belgium, south-western Germany, Italy, Sicily, Dalmatia, the Republic of Macedonia, Albania, northern Greece and on Crete, Sardinia and Corsica.

The larvae feed on Origanum vulgare, Thymus vulgaris, Thymus pulegioides, Satureja montana, Calamintha nepeta, Lavandula vera and Mentha species.

Subspecies
Chamaesphecia aerifrons aerifrons (Morocco, Algeria, Tunisia, Spain, Portugal, France, southern Belgium, south-western Germany, Italy, Sicily, Dalmatia, Macedonia, Albania, northern Greece, Crete)
Chamaesphecia aerifrons sardoa (Staudinger, 1856) (Sardinia, Corsica)

References

Moths described in 1847
Sesiidae
Moths of Europe
Moths of Africa